Oru Madapravinte Katha is a 1983 Indian Malayalam-language film, directed by Alleppey Ashraf. The film stars Prem Nazir, Mammootty, Sankaradi and Shubha. The film has musical score by G. Devarajan.

Cast

Prem Nazir as Ravi Prasad
Mammootty as Balachandran
Sankaradi
Shubha as Amne
Ajayan
Maniyanpilla Raju
K. P. A. C. Azeez
Bheeman Raghu
Kundara Johny
Kuthiravattam Pappu
Nalini as Sindhu
Ramu
Renuchandra
Seema as Prabha
Vanitha Krishnachandran
 Master Dinku
 Lathika

Soundtrack
The music was composed by G. Devarajan with lyrics by Yusufali Kechery.

References

External links
 

1983 films
1980s Malayalam-language films
Films directed by Alleppey Ashraf